Djimon Gaston Hounsou (born April 24, 1964) is a Beninese-American actor and model. He began his career appearing in music videos. He made his film debut in Without You I'm Nothing (1990) and earned widespread recognition for his role as Cinqué in the Steven Spielberg film Amistad (1997). He gained further recognition for his roles in Gladiator (2000), In America (2003), and Blood Diamond (2006), receiving nominations for the Academy Award for Best Supporting Actor for both of the latter films. He appeared as an antagonist in Furious 7 (2015). He played an important role as well in the French film Forces spéciales (2011). He has been nominated for a Golden Globe Award and three Screen Actors Guild Awards. 

In the Marvel Cinematic Universe, he portrays Korath the Pursuer in Guardians of the Galaxy (2014), Captain Marvel (2019) and the second episode of What If...? (2021). In the DC Extended Universe, he appears as the Fisherman King in Aquaman (2018), and as the wizard Shazam in Shazam! (2019), Black Adam (2022), and Shazam! Fury of the Gods (2023). He plays Papa Midnite in another DC film, Constantine (2005).

Early life
Hounsou was born in Cotonou, Benin, to Albertine and Pierre Hounsou. He emigrated to Lyon in France at the age of 12 with his brother, Edmond. Soon after arriving there, he dropped out of school and was homeless for a time. A chance meeting with a photographer led to an introduction to fashion designer Thierry Mugler, who encouraged Hounsou to pursue a modeling career. In 1987, he became a model and established a career in Paris. He moved to the United States in 1990.

Career

Acting

Between 1989 and 1991, Hounsou appeared in the music videos for "Straight Up" by Paula Abdul, "Love Will Never Do (Without You)" by Janet Jackson, and Madonna's "Express Yourself". He also appears in En Vogue's music video for "Hold On".

Hounsou's film debut was in the 1990 Sandra Bernhard film Without You I'm Nothing. He had television parts on Beverly Hills, 90210 and ER and a guest starring role on Alias. He had a larger role in the science fiction film Stargate.

Hounsou received wide critical acclaim and a Golden Globe Award nomination for his role as Cinqué in the 1997 Steven Spielberg film Amistad, and gained further notice as Juba in the 2000 film Gladiator. In 2004, he was nominated for the Academy Award for Best Supporting Actor for In America, making him the fourth African male to be nominated for an Oscar. In 2005 he played a mercenary in the movie The Island alongside Ewan McGregor and Scarlett Johansson. In 2006 he won the National Board of Review Award for Best Supporting Actor for his performance in Blood Diamond, and received Broadcast Film Critics Association, Screen Actors Guild Award and Academy Award nominations for this performance.

Hounsou had a supporting role in the 2009 science-fiction film Push, as Agent Henry Carver. In 2011, he starred as a French commando in the French film Forces spéciales.

Director Tim Story told IGN that if he were to do a third Fantastic Four film, he would like to have Hounsou as Black Panther. In November 2008, it was announced that Hounsou would provide the voice of Black Panther in the television series of the same name. He had signed on to play Abdiel in the film version of John Milton's Paradise Lost with Benjamin Walker and Bradley Cooper, but the film was scrapped in early February 2012.

In 2013, he appeared in the comedy film Baggage Claim alongside Paula Patton. He also voiced Drago Blodfist in How to Train Your Dragon 2 and portrayed Korath the Pursuer in the Marvel Studios film Guardians of the Galaxy, both in 2014. He played villains in two 2015 films, Seventh Son and Furious 7, the latter being the seventh installment of The Fast and the Furious film series where he played the role of Mose Jakande, a Nigerian-French mercenary.

On 17 February 2016, it was reported that Hounsou would join the second season of the television series Wayward Pines. Also in 2016, he played Chief Mbonga in The Legend of Tarzan.

In July 2018, Hounsou joined the DC Extended Universe, voicing the Fisherman King Ricou in Aquaman (with the character motion-captured by Andrew Crawford), and replacing Ron Cephas Jones as the Wizard Shazam in Shazam! (2019). Also in 2019, he reprised his role as Korath in the Marvel Studios film Captain Marvel and the animated series What If...?. He reprised his role as the wizard Shazam in Shazam! Fury of the Gods.

In November 2022, it was announced that Honsou had joined the cast of the Gran Turismo film, with Geri Halliwell playing his wife in the feature length film.

Modeling
On 24 February 2007, it was announced that Hounsou would be the new Calvin Klein underwear model. At the time, he was represented by Los Angeles modeling agent Omar Albertto.

Other work
In 2010, Hounsou was featured as the narrator in ESPN's series of "32 Teams, 1 Dream" commercials for the 2010 FIFA World Cup. He spoke at the Summit on Climate Change at the United Nations on 22 September 2009. On 1 December 2009, he told French media that developed countries "need to be held accountable" for their contribution to climate change.

Personal life
In 2007, Hounsou began dating model Kimora Lee Simmons. In 2009, Simmons gave birth to their son, Kenzo Lee Hounsou. Hounsou and Simmons visited Hounsou's family in his native Benin in the summer of 2008, where the two participated in a traditional commitment ceremony. They were adorned in traditional clothing and used the ceremony, in the presence of Hounsou's family, to confirm that they were "dedicated to each other 100%", although they emphasized the ceremony was not a wedding. In the début of Kimora Lee Simmons' show Kimora: Life in the Fab Lane, he was billed as her husband. Hounsou and Simmons, who were never legally married in the United States, announced their separation in November 2012.

Filmography

Film

Television

Video games

Awards and nominations

See also
 List of male underwear models

References

External links

 
 Djimon Hounsou: The Push Interview with Kam Williams

1964 births
Living people
African-American male actors
African-American male models
American male film actors
American male models
American male television actors
American male voice actors
Beninese emigrants to France
Beninese emigrants to the United States
Independent Spirit Award for Best Supporting Male winners
People from Los Angeles
People from Cotonou
21st-century African-American people
20th-century African-American people